Ctenuchidia is a genus of moths in the subfamily Arctiinae. The genus was erected by Augustus Radcliffe Grote in 1866.

Species
Ctenuchidia agrius (Fabricius, 1781)
Ctenuchidia butus (Fabricius, 1787)
Ctenuchidia fulvibasis Hering, 1925
Ctenuchidia gundlachia (Schaus, 1904)
Ctenuchidia interrupta Hering, 1925
Ctenuchidia subcyanea (Walker, 1854)
Ctenuchidia virginalis Forbes, 1930
Ctenuchidia virgo (Herrich-Schäffer, [1855])

References

External links

Arctiinae